Plosky (meaning "flat") is a shield volcano located in the northern part of Kamchatka Peninsula, Russia. It rises near the headwaters of Voyampolka River.

See also
List of volcanoes in Russia

References

Mountains of the Kamchatka Peninsula
Volcanoes of the Kamchatka Peninsula
Shield volcanoes of Russia